Nancy Julia Chodorow (born January 20, 1944) is an American sociologist and professor. She began her career as a professor of Women's studies at Wellesley College in 1973, and from 1974 on taught at the University of California, Santa Cruz, until 1986. She then was a professor in the departments of sociology and clinical psychology at the University of California, Berkeley until she resigned in 1986, after which she taught psychiatry at Harvard Medical School/Cambridge Health Alliance. Chodorow is often described as a leader in feminist thought, especially in the realms of psychoanalysis and psychology.

Chodorow has written a number of influential books in contemporary feminist writing, including The Reproduction of Mothering: Psychoanalysis and the Sociology of Gender (1978); Feminism and Psychoanalytic Theory (1989); Femininities, Masculinities, Sexualities: Freud and Beyond (1994); and The Power of Feelings: Personal Meaning in Psychoanalysis, Gender, and Culture (1999). In 1996, The Reproduction of Mothering was chosen by Contemporary Sociology as one of the ten most influential books of the past 25 years.

Biography

Personal life 
Dr. Chodorow was born on January 20, 1944, in New York, New York to a Jewish family. Her parents were Marvin Chodorow and Leah (Turitz) Chodorow. Her father was a professor of applied physics. Her mother was a community activist who helped establish the Stanford Village Nursery School and served as its first parents board president. In 1977, Chodorow married Michael Reich, a professor of economics. In 1996, they separated.

Education 
Chodorow graduated from Radcliffe College in 1966, where she studied under Beatrice and W.M. Whiting. Chodorow's work focused on personality and cultural anthropology now classified as pre-feminist work. In 1975, she received her Ph.D. in sociology from Brandeis University. Under the instruction of Philip Slater, Chodorow was influenced to focus her studies on the unconscious phenomena of psychoanalysis. She later referred to Slater's book, Glory of Hera (1968), as one of the most influential books in regards to a man's immense fear of women and its manifestation in culture. Following her Ph.D., Chodorow received clinical training at the San Francisco Psychoanalytic Institute from 1985 to 1993.

Postdoctoral clinical training 

 University of California, Berkeley, Dept. of Psychology, 1984–86, 
 Postdoctoral Intern San Francisco Psychoanalytic Institute 1986-1993

Influences

Sigmund Freud 
Chodorow's most profound influence stems from Freudian psychoanalysis. She critiques Freudian analysis with a feminist perspective to understand the mother-child relationship.  Chodorow uses the Freudian model of female development to reveal that a girl's gender development is related to how close the daughter is with her mother. Therefore, the girl is pursuing a privilege that a boy has already achieved. The boy has already received this attention, because he is more valued by the mother as an object of her own Oedipal gratification. However, the boy has both the need and the ability to detach himself from his mother. The female solves her inner conflict by converting her envy of male privilege into heterosexual desire. Using Freudian psychoanalytic theory, Chodorow explains that the Oedipus complex symbolically separates the male child from his mother, but young girls continue to identify with their mother and do not separate from them. Chodorow notes that Freud's theory of the Oedipal conflict and the Oedipal revolution is due to chance; the father must be in the right place at the right time. Chodorow's analysis led to the hypothesis that a female's desire for men is a direct result of her strong desire for her mother.

Additionally, Chodorow uses Sigmund Freud's theory to explain that the differences between men and women are largely due to capitalism and the absent father.  Chodorow acknowledges the ways in which the economy changed in 2003, and the psychological impact this had on both sexes in regards to shared parenting. The development of shared parenting has challenged the traditional mothering role, resulting in a paradigm where mother and children have insufficient time for each other.

Chodorow also argues that Freudian theory suppresses women. Nonetheless, the theory provides grounds for how people become gendered, how femininity and masculinity develop, and how sexism via sexual inequality is reproduced. Furthermore, Freud explains how nature becomes culture resulting in a second nature. Chodorow argues that this explains that the formation and organization of gender occur, not only through social institutions but also through transformations in the consciousness and the psyche.

Chodorow draws on Freud's idea of intrapsychic structures to understand the developmental differences between girls and boys. Freud explains that there are three parts to an individual: the id, the ego, and the super-ego. These parts produce rigid boundaries in the internal workings of our brains and impact our interactions in society. Chodorow uses this intrapsychic structure to explain that the internal workings of males and females are structurally different. Therefore, developmental differences are not inherent, rather these differences are produced through socialization.

Contributions

The Reproduction of Mothering: Psychoanalysis and the Sociology of Gender (1978) 

Chodorow's four main ideas throughout her book are; what personality traits are specific to women, how does the pattern of male dominance might be understood and changed, how most women think of themselves as heterosexual, and why women have the urge to mother. 

Chodorow views mothering as a dual structure, where motherhood is partly fixed by childhood experience and the social structure of kinship. She explains that the process of a woman becoming a mother goes beyond biology and instinct alone. Chodorow argues that "mothering" is built into the female personality because we are mothered by women. She continues to talk about how mothering is socially constructed, therefore it needs explanation. Chodorow argues in her book, The Reproduction of Mothering (1978; 2nd ed., 1999), that gender differences are comprised from formations of the Oedipal complex. Although both male and female children experience closeness with their mother, their experiences are different because females want to gain and derive gratification and that is something that is absent in males. She states that women's mothering is one of the most common elements of the sexual division of labor. Women have been subjected to having the sole responsibility of caring for a child and being the primary caretaker of the child. Women seek to mother the children and receive gratification from them which leads to women being in the domestic sphere and men being in the public sphere.  One skepticism of her assertion is that this could lead some people to believe that women are not psychologically suited to work in the public sphere. She begins with Freud's assertion that the individual is born bisexual and that the child's mother is its first sexual object. Chodorow, drawing on the work of Karen Horney and Melanie Klein, notes that the child forms its ego in reaction to the dominating figure of the mother. The male child forms this sense of independent agency easily, identifying with the agency and freedom of the father, and emulating his possessive interest in the mother/wife. This task is not as simple for the female child. The mother identifies with her more strongly, and the daughter attempts to make the father her new love object. The female child is then is stymied in her ego formation by the intense bond with the mother. Where male children typically experience love as a dyadic relationship, daughters are caught in a libidinal triangle where the ego is pulled between love for the father, the love of the mother, and concern and worry over the relationship of the father to the mother.

The strong bond between the mother and the infant not only shapes her identity but allows the child to acknowledge that the father is a separate being. Except, in circumstances where the father provides a similar form of primary care as the mother. This separation of the father and child can result in the child developing an ambivalence with the father. Therefore, the child is confused by the failure to recognize the mother's separateness. Consequently, children are more obedient to their father, but not because he is considered the authority figure or because of his strictness, rather because of the child's initial relationship to the father.

Nancy Chodorow and The Reproduction of Mothering Forty Years (2021) 
This work was so influential that in 2021, forty years after its initial release, Chodorow is revisiting it in Nancy Chodorow and The Reproduction of Mothering Forty Years.

In the book, she says "The mother is the early caregiver and primary source of identification for all children... A daughter continues to identify with the mother." Chodorow explains that the strong bond between mother and daughter inhibits the daughter from forming her own identity. The first bonding beings in infancy with the mother. This initial bond is true for both sexes, except, boys breakaway at an early age to identify with their fathers. Thus, maintaining the mother-daughter relationship and identity.

Gender personality 
For Chodorow, the contrast between the dyadic and triadic first love experiences explains the social construction of gender roles. This is through the universal degradation of women in culture, cross-cultural patterns in male behavior, and marital strain in Western society after Second Wave feminism. In marriage, the woman takes less of an interest in sex and more in the children. Her ambivalence towards sex eventually drives the male away. She devotes her energies to the children once she does reach sexual maturity.

Chodorow examines the psychological development of adult females and males. Chodorow argues that the psyches of men and women are structured differently because of dissimilar childhood experiences. The justification for why women tend to be more empathic is because women's ego boundaries are less fixed. Chodorow hypothesizes that if women are perceived by society as primarily and exclusively as mothers, then any liberation of women will continue to be experienced as traumatic by society.

Chodorow argues that masculinity is learned in the absence of an ongoing personal relationship with the father and without an available masculine role model, boys are taught more consciously how to be masculine. Boys' development of masculinity is used as a tool that would be used against them by the father. Therefore, masculine identity is due to gender role development. On the other hand, femininity is less consciously instilled in girls rather it is embedded in the ongoing relationship to the mother. Thus, female identification is predominantly parental. She says, “According to psychoanalytic theory, personality is a result of a boy’s or girl’s social- relational experiences from earliest infancy. Personality development is not the result of conscious parental intention. The nature and quality of the social relationships that a child experiences are appropriated, internalized, and organized by her or him and come to constitute her or his personality”.

She says, “Masculinity is defined as much negatively as positively.” Chodorow argues that the production of feminine identification is a rational process. In comparison, the production of male identification is defined by rejection rather than acceptance.

Feminism and Psychoanalytic Theory (1991) 
In her book, Feminism and Psychoanalytic Theory (1991), Chodorow expands on the finding that a man's suppression and denial of his need for love, often leads to an inability to tolerate others who can express their desire for love. Women, on the other hand, have not suppressed these needs and thus may be willing to deal with their lover or husband being somewhat emotionally unresponsive, in exchange for some amount of caring and love. Since this desire for love cannot be silenced through repression, men will simultaneously protect themselves against the threat of invasion by women, while still being in a heterosexual relationship. Chodorow suggests that if the father figure could become more visible and participatory in family life, then the emotional ambiguities in both sexes would be rectified.

Chodorow further synthesizes the female closeness with the mother quiets the sex drive toward men, because their inner emotional lives are far more satisfied. On the other hand, she suggests that the intense sex drive of men is a result of repression, and thus men fall in love much more romantically. She argues that this idea may be the basis for male aggression toward women.

Additionally, Chodorow focuses on the ways in which society values women for "being," but men for "action." More specifically, women are often viewed as objects, but men are rather viewed as subjects. She suggests that this idea has deeper implications, as women tend to be very relationship-oriented. Chodorow ties this idea back to Freudian theory by arguing that men pay a price for the rushed detachment from their mother, and the resulting repression of their feminine selves.

The Power of Feelings: Personal Meaning in Psychoanalysis, Gender; and Culture (1999) 
Published in 1999, this work by Chodorow addresses three key controversies: 1) The relation between culture and the constitution of individual identity, 2) The role of unconscious fantasy in conferring meaning on experience and 3) The epistemology of psychoanalytic theories of development and clinical interpretations of individual lives. The book is divided into four separate sections: Psychoanalysis, gender, culture and a conclusion section that ties everything together. The conclusion puts together the goal for psychoanalysis which is, to gain coherence and continuity you must come to terms with the psychic reality that one has. Throughout the book, she pleads her case in depth psychology and psychoanalytic interpretation as this is the only way that one will be able to come to full terms with themselves and their gender identity.

Chodorow utilizes a “both- and” stance throughout her work in an effort to combine elements of several different theoretical approaches, although most of her work focuses on psychoanalysis and feminist theory. When looking at these two theories she does address the shortcomings of them especially when looking at the psychology of gender. Chodorow argues that each person’s gender identity is developed through a combination of both personal and cultural meaning. She argues that “an individual, personal creation and a projective emotional and fantasy animation of cultural categories create the meaning of gender and gender identity for any individual.”

The Psychoanalytic Ear and the Sociological Eye: Toward an American Independent Tradition (2019) 
Dr. Nancy Chodorow explores her evolution from a sociologist and feminist scholar to a highly renowned psychoanalyst with her release of: “The Psychoanalytic Ear and the Sociological Eye: Toward an American Independent Tradition." In her book, Dr. Chodorow's primary focus is on the relationship between social relationships and individuality. Sociology and psychoanalysis, she says, have both been impoverished by not exploring the links and tensions between them. She finds parallels within psychoanalysis itself, where some analysts stress relationships as primary, while others emphasise the individual psyche. Chodorow’s twin peaks in this landscape are Erik Erikson and Hans Loewald. Setting these in dialogue with each other, Chodorow reflects her own cultural and psychoanalytic journeys. Her discussion of Erikson’s and Loewald’s ideas, and of what others have done with them, amounts to a history of American psychoanalysis. It also extends well beyond America, to include the British Independent Group and other aspects of European psychoanalysis. Chodorow’s call for a fresh relationship between psychoanalysis and sociology, anthropology and psychology, and between clinical practice and the university, opens new horizons in many directions.

See also
 Feminism and the oedipus complex
Sigmund Freud
Psychoanalysis
Feminist theory
Karen Horney
American Psychological Association
Philp Slater

Works

Books 

 Chodorow, Nancy (2020), Nancy Chodorow and The Reproduction of Mothering Forty Years On. Editor: Petra Bueskens. Palgrave Macmillan 
Chodorow, Nancy (2019), "The Psychoanalytic Ear and the Sociological Eye: Toward an American Independent Tradition," New York: Routledge, .
Chodorow, Nancy (2012), "Individualizing Gender and Sexuality: Theory and Practice," New York: Routledge, .
Chodorow, Nancy (1999), "The Power of Feelings: Personal Meaning in Psychoanalysis, Gender, and Culture,"  New Haven, CT: Yale University Press, .
Chodorow, Nancy (1994), "Femininities, Masculinities, Sexualities: Freud and Beyond," KY: University Press of Kentucky, .
Chodorow, Nancy (1991), "Feminism and Psychoanalytic Theory," New Haven, CT: Yale University Press, .
Chodorow, Nancy, (1978), "The Reproduction of Mothering: Psychoanalysis and the Sociology of Gender" CA: University of California Press,  .

References

External links 
 More information on Chodorow's works

1944 births
Living people
American sociologists
Feminist studies scholars
Radcliffe College alumni
Brandeis University alumni
American psychoanalysts
Gender studies academics
Jewish psychoanalysts
Relational psychoanalysts
American women sociologists
University of California, Berkeley College of Letters and Science faculty
Writers from the San Francisco Bay Area